Bernd Dreyer was an East German luger who competed in the mid-1970s. He won the gold medal in the men's doubles event at the 1976 FIL European Luge Championships in Hammarstrand, Sweden.

References

FIL-Luge.org list of European luge champions  - Accessed January 31, 2008.

German male lugers
Year of birth missing
Possibly living people
20th-century German people